Brooklyn was a New Zealand parliamentary electorate in Wellington city from 1946 to 1954. It was represented by two prominent members of the Labour Party: Peter Fraser, who was Prime Minister (1940–1949), and Arnold Nordmeyer, who was later Minister of Finance (1957–1960).

Population centres
The 1941 New Zealand census had been postponed due to World War II, so the 1946 electoral redistribution had to take ten years of population growth and movements into account. The North Island gained a further two electorates from the South Island due to faster population growth. The abolition of the country quota through the Electoral Amendment Act, 1945 reduced the number and increased the size of rural electorates. None of the existing electorates remained unchanged, 27 electorates were abolished, eight former electorates were re-established, and 19 electorates were created for the first time, including Brooklyn. The electorate was based on the southern suburbs of Wellington city, around the hill suburb of Brooklyn.

History
The electorate existed from 1946 to 1954, but both the MPs who held the seat were prominent in the Labour Party; Peter Fraser, who was Prime Minister of New Zealand from 1940–1949 in the First Labour Government; and after Fraser's death on 12 December 1950 Arnold Nordmeyer, who was later Minister of Finance in the Second Labour Government from 1957–1960, famous for the Black Budget that contributed to Labour's defeat at the 1960 election. In 1954 Nordmeyer moved to the Island Bay electorate.

Members of Parliament
Key

Election results

1951 election

1951 by-election

1949 election

1946 election

Notes

References

Historical electorates of New Zealand
1946 establishments in New Zealand
1954 disestablishments in New Zealand
Politics of the Wellington Region